Ulf Kjell Gür (born 3 December 1951) is a Swedish theatre producer, filmmaker and singer-songwriter. He was artistic and managing director of Gothenburg City Theatre from 1992 to 1995, CEO at Sandrews Teater AB in 1995–1996, producer at the Royal Dramatic Theatre, Stockholm, from 1997 to 2002, and then producer at the Boulevardteatern, Stockholm, from 2002 to 2006. He has been involved in several international theatre, dance and music productions/festivals. As a singer/musician he was active in Tom Trick from 1979 to 1983, and later a founder member in the European music group NOWlab since 1985.

Stage productions (selection) 
Kiss of the Spider Woman by Manuel Puig, 1988, Pistolteatern, Stockholm, directed by Christian Tomner
Miss Julie by August Strindberg, 1989, Pistolteatern, directed by Christian Tomner
Kanin, kanin by Coline Serreau, 1993, Gothenburg City Theatre, directed by Gunilla Berg
Count of Monte Cristo by Alexandre Dumas/adapted by Per Lysander, 1994, Gothenburg City Theatre, directed by Ronny Danielsson
The Rise and Fall of Little Voice by Jim Cartwright, 1994, Gothenburg City Theatre, directed by Joachim Siegård
The Blue Angel by Heinrich Mann, 1996, Intiman, Stockholm, directed by Dilek Gür & Ulf Kjell Gür
Don Juan by Molière, 1999, Royal Dramatic Theatre, directed by Mats Ek
The Dresser by Ronald Harwood, 2001, Royal Dramatic Theatre, directed by Thorsten Flinck
Söderkåkar by Gideon Wahlberg, 2005, Boulevardteatern, directed by Anders Wällhed

References

External links
 
 Ulf Kjell Gür at Project Runeberg
 Dagens Nyheter: Teater ska ingjuta livsmod – Ulf Kjell Gür
 Svensk Mediadatabas: Ulf Kjell Gür
 Popfakta: Ulf Kjell Gür

1951 births
Living people
Swedish theatre managers and producers
Swedish male singers